Ahmed Kamal may refer to:

 Ahmed Kamal (cricketer) (born 1977), former Bangladeshi cricket
 Ahmed Kamal (footballer) (born 1981), Egyptian football defender
 Ahmed Kamal (Egyptologist) (1851–1923), Egypt's first Egyptologist
 Ahmed Kamal (scientist) (born 1956) Indian scientist